The 2000–01 season was the 82nd season in the history of Angers SCO and their eighth consecutive season in the top flight. The club participated in Division 2, the Coupe de France, and the Coupe de la Ligue. The season covered the period from 1 July 2000 to 30 June 2001.

Angers finished in the bottom to return immediately to the Championnat National after a one-year absence.

Competitions

Overall record

Division 2

League table

Results summary

Results by round

Matches

Coupe de France

Coupe de la Ligue

References

Angers SCO seasons
Angers